Floridatown is an unincorporated community and census-designated place located in Santa Rosa County, Florida. It is now considered to be a neighborhood within Pace. Its population was 244 as of the 2010 census.

Geography
The neighborhood is bordered by Escambia Bay to the south, U.S. Route 90 in Florida to the north. Its eastern border is Air Products Road, and its Western Border is the Barnett Mill Creek.

References

Unincorporated communities in Santa Rosa County, Florida
Unincorporated communities in Florida
Census-designated places in Santa Rosa County, Florida
Census-designated places in Florida